The 2009–10 Arizona Wildcats men's basketball team represented the University of Arizona during the 2009–10 NCAA Division I men's basketball season. The Wildcats, led by first year head coach Sean Miller, played their home games at the McKale Center and are members of the Pacific-10 Conference.

Recruiting class

Roster

Depth chart

Schedule

|-
!colspan=9 style="background:#; color:white;"| Exhibition

|-
!colspan=9 style="background:#; color:white;"| Non-conference regular season

|-
!colspan=9 style="background:#;"|  Pac-10 regular season

|-
!colspan=9 style="background:#;"| Pac-10 tournament

Awards
Derrick Williams
Pac-10 All-Conference First Team
Pac-10 Freshman of the Year
Nic Wise
Pac-10 All-Conference First Team
Pac-10 Player of the Week – February 1, 2010

References

Arizona Wildcats men's basketball seasons
Arizona Wildcats
Arizona Wildcats
Arizona Wildcats